Kurt Hitke (1 December 1889 in Dresden, Germany – 23 February 1979 in Miami, Florida) was an American racecar driver.

Biography 
Hitke was born in Dresden, Germany, and worked from an early age in a blacksmith shop. At the outbreak of World War I, he was working on a German merchant ship which was in Western Hemisphere waters. Consequently, he stayed in the United States as it was impossible for the ship to return to Germany due to British naval superiority. He became one of the two best known racing drivers in the country, being second only to Eddie Rickenbacker who became America's leading World War I flying ace and later headed Eastern Air Lines. In addition to his driving abilities, Hitke was an outstanding automobile mechanic and is credited with inventing the first straight eight motor which was later used very successfully by the Packard Motor Company and others. His interest was largely in racing automobiles and both the Roamer and the Kenilworth, which he designed, were considered outstanding in the early 1920s.

A naturalised American by the time of his racing days, Hitke later ran an insurance company in Illinois.

Indy 500 results

References
 History - Auto racing 1894-1942
 Kurt Hitke

American racing drivers
Indianapolis 500 drivers
1889 births
1979 deaths